Cellariidae is a family of bryozoans belonging to the order Cheilostomatida.

Genera:
 Acerinucleus Brown, 1958
 Atelestozoum Harmer, 1926
 Cellaria Ellis & Solander, 1786
 Cellariaeforma Rogick, 1956
 Cryptostomaria Canu & Bassler, 1927
 Dimorphocellaria Voigt, 1930
 Dubiocellaria d'Hondt & Schopf, 1985
 Erinella Canu & Bassler, 1927
 Escharicellaria Voigt, 1924
 Euginoma Jullien, 1882
 Formosocellaria d'Hondt, 1981
 Hemistylus Voigt, 1928
 Henrimilnella D'Hondt & Gordon, 1999
 Melicerita Milne Edwards, 1836
 Mesostomaria Canu & Bassler, 1927
 Paracellaria Moyano, 1969
 Smitticellaria Gordon & Taylor, 1999
 Steginocellaria David & Pouyet, 1986
 Stomhypselosaria Canu & Bassler, 1927
 Swanomia Hayward & Thorpe, 1989
 Syringotrema Harmer, 1926

References

Cheilostomatida